Zero Film Festival is one of several independent film festival exclusive to self-financed filmmakers.  Founded by Brad Bores and Richard Hooban in 2007, Zero Film Festival holds annual festival events in Toronto, New York City, Los Angeles, London and Miami Beach. The American Buffalo is the symbol for the festival, representing the independent spirit.

The festival presents feature length narrative and documentary films, shorts, animations, experiments and music videos.  Each year the festival features filmmakers and films from a different conflict region, past countries include Georgia, Afghanistan and Lebanon.  Another component of the festival is the "made for zero" series, in which established filmmakers and artists are asked to create unique works with no budget.

Festival 

The mission statement of the festival is to provide a platform in key cultural centers for self-financed films from the global independent film community.  Zero Film Festival focuses on community, inclusivity and a general positive atmosphere.

The festival is typically held in non-traditional cinema venues such as warehouses, film studios, art galleries, museums and open spaces.  Often there is a live music component coinciding with the film screenings.

History 

The origins of the Zero Film Festival emerged from underground screenings held in downtown Los Angeles for the local DIY film community.  Following positive responses, the festival opened its doors for international participation.  The first official Zero Film Festival was held at the Flower St. Warehouse in December 2008. 2009 saw the expansion to New York as well as the first West Coast Tour with screenings in Seattle, Portland, San Francisco, Hollywood and Orange County. In the Spring of 2010, Zero Film Festival held its first international screening at the Cinecycle in Toronto, Ontario. 2010 Miami Beach was added, holding a screening at the Raleigh Hotel (Miami Beach) in conjunction with the Miami Beach Cinematheque and the French Consulate during the Art Basel Fair.

External links 
 
 IMDb festivals

Film festivals in New York City
Film festivals established in 2007
Film festivals in London